At the 1928 Summer Olympics in Amsterdam, eleven swimming events were contested, six for men and five for women. The competitions were held from Saturday August 4, 1928, to Saturday August 11, 1928.

There were 182 participants from 28 countries competing.

Medal table

Medal summary

Men's events

Women's events

Participating nations
182 swimmers from 28 nations competed.  Chile, Ireland, Panama, the Philippines, and Poland competed in swimming for the first time.

References
 

 
1928 Summer Olympics events
1928
1928 in swimming
Swimming competitions in the Netherlands